Bradbury Canyon may refer to:

Bradbury Canyon, California, USA, of Los Angeles County, in the vicinity of the towns of Bradbury and Azusa, and site of the Bradbury Debris Basin
Bradbury Canyon, Utah, USA, of Summit County, in the vicinity of the towns of Summit and Coalville